Sagen Maddalena is an American sport shooter. She represents USA at the 2020 Summer Olympics in Tokyo.

She is a specialist in the United States Army and serves as a shooter/instructor with the international team of the Army Marksmanship Unit.

References

1993 births
Living people
American female sport shooters
American military Olympians
Shooters at the 2020 Summer Olympics
Olympic shooters of the United States
People from Woodland, California
Sportspeople from California
United States Army soldiers
21st-century American women
20th-century American women